Wilfred Agbonavbare (5 October 1966 – 27 January 2015) was a Nigerian professional footballer who played as a goalkeeper.

He spent the better part of his professional career with Spanish club Rayo Vallecano, appearing in 189 competitive matches over six seasons (three in La Liga).

Club career
In his country, Lagos-born Agbonavbare played for New Nigeria Bank F.C. and BCC Lions FC. In 1990, he moved to Spain where he would spend the rest of his career, starting with Rayo Vallecano in Segunda División.

In his second season with the Madrid outskirts club, Agbonavbare appeared in all 38 league games (3,332 minutes of action, 27 goals conceded, second-best in the competition) as the team finished second and returned to La Liga after two years of absence. He continued to be first-choice in the following years, contributing with 31 matches to another top-flight promotion in 1995.

In 1995–96, Agbonavbare lost his starting position to Spanish international Abel Resino. In the following summer, he signed for second level side Écija Balompié, being the most used player in his position but suffering team relegation. 

After one year in his country training to remain fit, Agbonavbare retired due to lack of offers at only 31.

International career
Agbonavbare appeared with the Nigerian under-20s at the 1983 FIFA World Youth Championship in Mexico. He played for more than one decade with the full side, being selected for the 1994 African Cup of Nations and that year's FIFA World Cup, backing up Peter Rufai on both occasions.

Personal life
Agbonavbare settled in the Community of Madrid after retiring as a player, working as a delivery man and a goalkeeper coach. In late January 2015 it was revealed that he was suffering from cancer, and he subsequently underwent treatment at the Hospital Universitario Príncipe de Asturias in Alcalá de Henares.

Both Agonavbare's former team Rayo Vallecano and its opponents Atlético Madrid displayed a banner during their league match at the Vicente Calderón Stadium on 24 January that read "Fuerza Wilfred" (You Can Do It Wilfred). He succumbed to the disease three days later, aged 48.

References

External links

1966 births
2015 deaths
Sportspeople from Lagos
Nigerian footballers
Association football goalkeepers
Nigeria international footballers
Nigeria under-20 international footballers
1994 African Cup of Nations players
1994 FIFA World Cup players
Africa Cup of Nations-winning players
Nigeria Professional Football League players
La Liga players
Segunda División players
New Nigerian Bank F.C. players
BCC Lions F.C. players
Rayo Vallecano players
Écija Balompié players
Nigerian expatriate footballers
Expatriate footballers in Spain
Nigerian expatriate sportspeople in Spain
Deaths from cancer in Spain
Deaths from bone cancer